West Ham North was a borough constituency in the County Borough of West Ham, in what was then Essex but is now Greater London.  It returned one Member of Parliament (MP) to the House of Commons of the Parliament of the United Kingdom, elected by the first-past-the-post voting system.

History 
The constituency was created under the Redistribution of Seats Act 1885 for the 1885 general election, and abolished for the 1918 general election.

It was re-established for the 1950 general election, and abolished again for the February 1974 general election.

Boundaries

1885–1918
The 1885 act created a new parliamentary borough of West Ham which was divided into two single-member divisions. West Ham, North Division consisted of the part of the Local Government District of West Ham north of a boundary formed by a number of railway lines and roads, described as follows:
From a point where the north side of the present London and Tilbury Railway crosses the west boundary of West Ham Parish; thence in a north-easterly direction along the north side of the said railway to a point where the east side of the present North Woolwich Branch of the Great Eastern Railway crosses it; thence in a northerly direction along the east side of the last-mentioned railway to a point opposite the centre of Abbey Road; thence in a north-easterly and easterly direction along the centres of Abbey Road, Church Street North, Portway, and Plashet Lane to the eastern boundary of West Ham Parish.

1950–1974
West Ham North Borough Constituency was created by the Representation of the People Act 1948, and was first contested at the 1950 general election. The seat was defined as consisting of eight wards of the County Borough of West Ham: Broadway, Forest Gate, High Street, Newtown, Park, Plashet Road, Upton and West Ham.

Members of Parliament

MPs 1885–1918

MPs 1950–1974

Elections

Elections in the 1880s

Elections in the 1890s

Elections in the 1900s

Elections in the 1910s 

General Election 1914–15:

A General Election was due to take place by the end of 1915. By the autumn of 1914, the following candidates had been adopted to contest that election. 
Liberal: Maurice de Forest
Unionist: Ernest Wild
Due to the outbreak of war, the election never took place.

Elections in the 1950s

Elections in the 1960s

Elections in the 1970s

See also 
 West Ham South, 1918–1950

References

Sources

External links

Parliamentary constituencies in London (historic)
Constituencies of the Parliament of the United Kingdom established in 1885
Constituencies of the Parliament of the United Kingdom disestablished in 1918
Constituencies of the Parliament of the United Kingdom established in 1950
Constituencies of the Parliament of the United Kingdom disestablished in 1974
Politics of the London Borough of Newham
West Ham